Albania competed at the 2013 Mediterranean Games in Mersin, Turkey from the 20th to 30 June 2013.

Medalists

Athletics 

Men
Track & road events

Women
Track & road events

Boxing 

Men

Cycling

Football

Men's tournament

Team

COACH:  Skënder Gega

The following players were called up and participated in the 2013 Mediterranean Games football tournament, which began on 19 June in Mersin, Turkey.

Current coaching staff:

Standings

Results

Classification 5–8 matches

Seventh place match

Gymnastics

Artistic 

Men

Judo

Karate 

Men

Shooting 

Men

Women

Swimming 

Men

Women

Taekwondo

Table tennis 

Men

Women

Weightlifting 

Men

Women

Wrestling

Men's Freestyle

Men's Greco-Roman

References

https://web.archive.org/web/20130702231513/http://info.mersin2013.gov.tr/medals_country.aspx?n=ALB

Nations at the 2013 Mediterranean Games
2013
Mediterranean Games